Events from the year 1999 in Denmark.

Incumbents
 Monarch – Margrethe II
 Prime minister – Poul Nyrup Rasmussen

Events

The arts

Architecture

Film
 10 January – Thomas Vinterberg's The Celebration wins the award for Best Foreign Language Film at the 64th New York Film Critics Circle Awards.
 24 January – The Celebration is nominated for a Golden Globe for Best Foreign Language Film at the 56th Golden Globe Awards but the award goes to the Brazilian Central Station.
 21 February – Søren Kragh-Jacobsen's Mifune's Last Song wins the Jury Grand Prix at the 49th Berlin International Film Festival.
 21 March – Anders Thomas Jensen's short comedy film Election Night wins an Oscar for Best Short Subject at the 71st Academy Awards.

Literature

Music
 6 November – Lys på din vej by Frederik Magle is premiered at the christening of prince Nikolai of Denmark in Fredensborg Palace.

Sports

Badminton
 914 March  Peter Gade wins gold in men's single at the 1999 All England Open Badminton Championships.
 1023 May  Denmark wins a gold medal four bronze medals at the 1999 IBF World Championships.

Cycling
 May – Michael Sandstød wins Four Days of Dunkirk.
 Tayeb Braikia (DEN) and Jimmi Madsen (DEN) win the Six Days of Copenhagen sox-day track cycling race.

Football
 13 May  Ab wins the 1998–99 Danish Cup by defeating AAB 21 in the final.
 8 September – Denmark qualifies for UEFA Euro 2000 by defeating Italy 3–3 in their last match in Group 1 of the UEFA Euro 2000 qualifying.

Other
 6 March – Wilson Kipketer wins silver in Men's 800 metres at the 1999 IAAF World Indoor Championships in Maebashi, Kapan.
 	26 July – 1 August  Mette Jacobsen wins a gold medal in Women's 200 metre butterfly
 29 August – Wilson Kipketer wins gold in Men's 800 metres at the 1999 World Championships in Athletics in Seville, Spain.
 2 September – Hans Nielsen wins the 1989 Individual Speedway World Championship in Munich, Germany.
 24 October – Thomas Bjørn wins Sarazen World Open on the 1999 European Tour.

Births
 31 March – Jens Odgaard, footballer
 28 August – Prince Nikolai of Denmark, royal
 14 September – Count Richard von Pfeil und Klein-Ellguth, royal

Deaths
 14 February – Sven Havsteen-Mikkelsen, painter and illustrator (born 1912)
 14 March – Abraham Kurland, olympic wrestler (born 1912)
 9 May – Ole Søltoft, actor (born 1941)

See also
1999 in Danish television

References

 
Denmark
Years of the 20th century in Denmark
1990s in Denmark
Denmark